Paul Spong  is a Canadian neuroscientist and cetologist from originally from New Zealand. He has been researching orcas (or killer whales) in British Columbia since 1967, and is credited with increasing public awareness of whaling, through his involvement with Greenpeace.

Early life
Paul Spong was born in Auckland, New Zealand, in 1939. He spent his early life in Whakatane on the north east coast of New Zealand.  He studied law and psychology at the University of Canterbury in Christchurch.  In 1963 Spong became a graduate student in Dr.Donald Lindsley's Lab in the Psychology Department at UCLA (University of California at Los Angeles]. He also worked in Dr. Ross Adey's Space Biology Lab in UCLA's Brain Research Institute (BRI). His work included computer analyses of human brain wave patterns and tracking information pathways. Spong's doctoral thesis was on sensory stimulation, perception, and human consciousness.

Transfer to Vancouver
In 1967 Dr. Murray Newman of the Vancouver Aquarium, asked Dr. Patrick McGeer, head of the Neurological Lab at the University of British Columbia (UBC), to find a "whale scientist" to assist him at the aquarium. Dr. Spong was selected as the candidate to work at the Vancouver Aquarium with orca whales (Orcinus orca) after a successful interview and a recommendation from the head of the lab at UCLA.

Dr. Spong arrived in Vancouver with his wife Linda, in April 1967. This was a few months after Skana, the orca that Paul would be working with, had been bought by the Vancouver Aquarium from The Pacific Northwest Boat Show.

Whale Research
Dr. Spong started his research by testing the vision of a dolphin named Diana. He determined that she could see underwater about as well as a cat can see in air.  Good but not great vision. He then started testing Skana's eyesight, rewarding her with half a herring every time she correctly distinguished between one and two vertical lines displayed on cards dropped into slots on an apparatus.  Skana's task was to press a lever beside the card with 2 lines. The gap between the lines was varied to determine when Skana could no longer discriminate it. She took many hundreds of trials to learn the initial discrimination and became a willing performer.  Then, at a point when Skana was performing at 100% correct, she suddenly switched her behaviour and started pressing only the "wrong" lever.  Her performance fell to 0% and stayed there for many days. After some thought, and finding no comparable report in behavioural literature, Spong concluded that he whale was giving wrong answers on purpose and trying to communicate something to him. It was one word: NO! This was the first breakthrough Paul had in understanding orcas.

In April 1968, a second orca, Hyak was captured and brought to the Aquarium. Hyak was kept in a separate pool from Skana. After many months in isolation, Hyak had become sedentary, floating in one corner of his pool day and night. Dr. Spong decided to run an experiment to find out if an acoustic reward could be used to modify Hyak's behaviour.  He placed an underwater speaker in one corner of the pool and connected it to audio equipment in his lab next door.  A 3khz tone started a trial.  If Hyak moved out of his corner, Paul turned on a reward sound. Soon, Hyak was swimming sedately around the pool.  Dr. Spong then modified the reward criteria, essentially saying that anything except staying on one corner of the pool would be rewarded with sound. Soon, Hyak was an enthusiastic performer.  Dr. Spong learned the importance of acoustics for orcas through these experiments. His experiments with music and sound helped Hyak’s recovery from lethargy. When the Hyak and Skana were placed in the same pool, he observed that they vocalised together.

Among Dr. Spng’s frequent interactions with the whales was an event involving Skana. Paul had developed a habit of going to the Aquarium in the early morning, before the public arrived and sitting on a little training platform dangling his bare feet in the water.  Skana would come over to him and  Paul would  rub his feet over Skana’s head and body.  She seemed to enjoy that.  One morning, Skana swam slowly towards him as usual; then when just a couple of inches away from Paul’s feet suddenly opened her jaws and slashed them across Paul’s feet, so close he could feel her teeth on the tops and bottoms of his feet.  Naturally, Paul jerked his feet out of the water and sat trembling on the platform.  After quite some time he calmed down enough to put his feet back into the water.  Skana did it again and Paul reacted the same way.  By now Paul was curious.  What was Skana doing?  They went through this circle 10 or 11 times, until finally Paul was able to leave his feet in the water while Skana slashed her teeth across them without reacting. And then, Skana stopped.  In that moment, Paul realised with sudden insight that he was no longer afraid of Skana . She had quickly and efficiently de-conditioned Paul’s fear of her immensely powerful jaws and teeth.  Not only that, she had demonstrated that she was in total control of her body, and that she would not harm him.  Paul came to regard this as a great gift from Skana to him, as he has not since experienced fear in the presence of an orca.

1968 Lecture
In a 1968, Dr. Paul Spong delivered a lecture at the University of British Columbia, describing his experience with the two whales at the Vancouver Aquarium. He described the whales as "highly intelligent, social animals" and advised that they should not be kept in captivity. He proposed transferring the whales to a semi-wild environment (such as Pender Harbour) in order to study them in their natural habitat. Dr. Spong also mentioned that humans could someday communicate with whales.

His comments from this lecture were published in local newspapers and interviews with radio stations were scheduled. However, Dr. Newman from the Aquarium did not appreciate Dr. Spong's recommendation about freeing the whales. This pushed Dr. Newman to suspend the research project Dr. Spong was working on.  Shortly afterwards, Dr. Spong’s contract with the Aquarium came up for renewal.  It was not renewed.

1969 Address 
In June 1969 Spong gave an uninvited address to the Western Psychological Association In which he discussed his belief that taking psychedelic drugs helped him tune in to the whales’ space and that this could help with orca-human communications

KWOOF
Killer Whale (Orcinus Orca) Foundation, or KWOOF was the foundation that Dr. Paul Spong created after leaving the Aquarium. One purpose of the foundation was to stop whale captures in British Columbia, Canada. 
In December 1969 Spong travelled to Pender Harbour, where fishermen had captured 12 whales. Of the 12 whales, only one whale, Corky, has survived in captivity for more than 50 years.  Spong has spent over three decades trying to free her.

Maplewood Mudflats
In 1972 Dr. Paul Spong was living in a hippie commune in North Vancouver, called the "Maplewood Mudflats". The District of North Vancouver wanted to turn the Mudflats into a shopping centre.  Paul led the opposition to the proposal.  He was interviewed about the community in a film made for the NFB (National Film Board of Canada), by Robert Fresco and Kris Paterson, called "Mudflats Living". https://www.nfb.ca/film/mudflats_living/  Another film was made by Seattle film maker Sean Malone called “Living on the Mud”.  While the squatters were evicted and their homes burned, the mudflats ultimately became a conservation area and wildlife preserve.

OrcaLab 
In the summer of 1970, Dr. Paul Spong established the OrcaLab on  Hanson Island. The Lab is located about 200 miles northwest of Vancouver on Blackney Pass.  Orca families travel through the pass towards Johnstone Strait where they feast on migrating salmon, socialise with others of their community, and visit special "rubbing beaches".  Hanson Island was an ideal place to study orcas in their natural habitat.

At the laboratory, Dr. Spong started to monitor and record  the modulations and songs sung by the whales with a hydrophone hung over a convenient rocky shelf in the bay and connected to a tape recorder.  Eventually OrcaLab created a network of hydrophones that covered a 50 sq. km area of ocean that became recognised as Critical Habitat for the Northern Resident orca  community.  At first the hydrophone signals were transmitted to the Lab by VHF radio, then by wireless microwave network.  The operational philosophy of OrcaLab as a land based research station is "learning without interference".  

In 2000 Dr. Paul Spong with Japanese colleagues set up an online portal for listening to the whales called "www.orca-live.net" which broadcast live sounds from OrcaLab's hydrophones via the Internet, making it possible for people around the world with internet access to hear the sounds of orcas.  The project also included a link to live video cameras.   Viewers could log in and chat to fellow orca enthusiasts.  A sister site was set up in Japan to watch turtles under the Nature Network banner.  The turtle aspect of the project eventually ended, but the orca webcast continues. and has expanded in partnership with explore.org.

Logging issue

In the 1980s, the forest of Hanson Island was threatened by clearcut logging.  Paul with his wife Helena Symonds and many allies including the 'Namgis First Nation mounted a campaign that opposed the logging.  Hundreds of letters from people around the world, including many from Europe and Japan were written to the British Columbia government.  The logging company ownership changed.  At one point Paul travelled to New Zealand to appeal to the President of the new owner Fletcher Challenge.  Eventually, the forest of Hanson Island was protected under negotiations between the BC government, First Nations, environmental groups and logging companies that established the Great Bear Rainforest.  Today it is managed by the Yukusam Heritage Society which includes representatives from 3 First Nations whose territory includes Hanson Island.  OrcaLab's work continues under license from the Society.  Yulusam is the traditional name of Hanson Island.

Whaling 
In 1972 Paul met the Canada author Farley Mowat who was on a cross country tour promoting his book A whale for the killing.  Farley convinced Paul about the desperate plight faced by many species of Great Whales.  Paul with his wife Linda began a campaign as the Canadian branch of Project Jonah aimed at convincing Canada to stop whaling.  Within a year, Canada did so.  Paul set his sights higher and convinced Greenpeace, at the time an anti nuclear testing organisation, to take up the whales’ cause.  Vancouver Sun columnist Bob Hunter and other Greenpeacers formed the  Stop Ahab committee of Greenpeace and set about planning to confront whalers on the high seas.  In 1973 Paul and Bob put on the Christmas Whale Show at Vancouver’s Queen Elizabeth Theatre to raise funds for a trip to Japan aimed at convincing that country to stop whaling.  Canadian musician Gordon Lightfoot called during the show and pledged $5,00 to support the effort.  In 1974, Paul and his family travelled to Japan and made presentations at 21 venues that included theatres in shopping malls and schools.  Paul also met with whaling industry and government officials.  These efforts unsuccessful, Paul returned to Canada convinced about the need to confront the whalers directly.  In 1975, Paul and his family took the now named Greenpeace Whale Show across Canada, then to Iceland and Norway.  In Norway, they visited the Bureau of International Whaling statistics where Paul, presenting himself as a whale scientist interested in sperm whales, obtained access to whalers’ log books showing the locations of whaling operations off the coast of California.  When Bob Hunter received this information he knew where to head but kept the information to himself until close to the time the Russian whaling fleet would be off the coast of California. The Phyllis Cormack headed there in July, confronting the whalers off Mendocino.  A dramatic scene  showing a harpoon flying over the heads of Bob and Paul Watson in a tiny zodiac was aired on Walter Cronkite’s CBS evening news show just before the International Whaling Commission (IWC) met in London.  The result was a dramatic uplift in public awareness of the whaling issue and pressure on the Commission which was essentially a whalers' club at that point. Paul by happenstance managed to attend the Commission’s meeting, and subsequently was able to attend meetings of the IWC Scientific Committee and Plenary meetings of the Commission as an NGO observer, one of many whose aim was to end commercial whaling.   

In 1982, the International Whaling Commission voted by 3/4 majority to impose a moratorium on commercial whaling.  The moratorium came into effect in 1986 and still stands today.

Corky 
In 1990, Switzerland’s Bellerive Foundation hosted a conference to discuss cetaceans in captivity.  Paul presented information about the Northern Resident A5 pod member named Corky (A16) and suggested her as a candidate for release back into the wild, where her family was well known.  Corky had been captured in Pender Harbour, British Columbia in 1969 and taken to Marineland of the Pacific, then to SeaWorld San Diego.  An international campaign followed highlighted by appeals to Sea World from children from 21 countries who contributed painted patches that were turned into to a huge banner nearly 2km long.  Corky’s FREEDOM BANNER was the inspiration of Austria's Niki Entrup. It was displayed around Sea World, in European capitals, and in western US states and British Columbia.  Sea World remained obstinate in refusing to consider releasing Corky. In 2000 Corky’s mother Stripe (A23) died, ending the opportunity for them to meet again. The campaign to Free Corky continued and presently involves creation of the Double Bay Sanctuary on Hanson Island as Corky’s retirement home where ideally she would be cared for by the Sea World staff she knows well.  Owner of the old Double Bay lodge Michael Reppy, who is building the Sanctuary, has the support of the ‘Namgis First Nation as well as Paul.  Corky is still alive (as of July 2022) so she still has a chance to meet her family again.

See also
Whaling
Greenpeace
Orca

References

Weyler, R (2004). Greenpeace. Vancouver, BC: Raincoast Books. In Stop Ahab pp. 197–236;
Zelko, F (2013), Make It a Green Peace, New York, NY: Oxford University Press.  pp. 161–180

External links
Orca-live Site
Orca sounds Live
Vancouver Aquarium Official Site
Turtle live
NFB of Canada -Mudflats Living (at 6:00)

1939 births
Living people

Orca researchers
Canadian marine biologists
Canadian neuroscientists
People from Whakatāne
New Zealand emigrants to Canada